The 1985–86 Drexel Dragons men's basketball team represented Drexel University  during the 1985–86 NCAA Division I men's basketball season. The Dragons, led by 9th year head coach Eddie Burke, played their home games at the Daskalakis Athletic Center and were members of the East Coast Conference (ECC).

The team finished the season 19–12, and finished in 1st place in the ECC in the regular season.

In the 1985–86 season, sophomore guard Michael Anderson set the school records at the time for both assists and steals in a season, recording 225 assists and 92 steals.

In the season opener against Villanova, Anderson also set the school record for most free throws attempted in a game, with 24.

On December 15, 1985, in their game against Coppin State, the team set a school record for most steals in a game as a team with 19 steals.

Roster

Schedule

|-
!colspan=9 style="background:#F8B800; color:#002663;"| Regular season
|-

|-
!colspan=12 style="background:#FFC600; color:#07294D;"| ECC Tournament

|-
!colspan=9 style="background:#F8B800; color:#002663;"| 1986 NCAA Division I men's basketball tournament

Awards
Michael Anderson
ECC Player of the Year
ECC All-Conference First Team
ECC Tournament Most Valuable Player
ECC All-Tournament Team

Eddie Burke
ECC Coach of the Year

John Rankin
ECC Rookie of the Year
ECC All-Rookie Team
ECC All-Conference Second Team
ECC All-Tournament Team

References

Drexel Dragons men's basketball seasons
Drexel
Drexel
1985 in sports in Pennsylvania
1986 in sports in Pennsylvania